Randall Arauz is an environmentalist working in Costa Rica. He was awarded  the Goldman Environmental Prize in 2010 for his efforts on the protection of the sharks and banning of the shark finning industry. Arauz was awarded The Gothenburg Award for Sustainable Development for 2010, shared with Ken Sherman.

References 

Year of birth missing (living people)
Living people
People from San José, Costa Rica
Costa Rican environmentalists
Shark conservation
Goldman Environmental Prize awardees